Nebria gebleri is a species of ground beetle in the family Carabidae. It is found in North America.

Subspecies
These six subspecies belong to the species Nebria gebleri:
 Nebria gebleri albimontis Kavanaugh, 1984
 Nebria gebleri cascadensis Kavanaugh, 1979
 Nebria gebleri fragariae Kavanaugh, 1979
 Nebria gebleri gebleri Dejean, 1831
 Nebria gebleri rathvoni LeConte, 1853
 Nebria gebleri siskiyouensis Kavanaugh, 1979

References

Further reading

 

gebleri
Articles created by Qbugbot
Beetles described in 1831